Pandanus leram is a pandan or screw pine, belonging to the monocot family Pandanaceae. It is endemic to the Andaman Islands and Nicobar Islands south of Myanmar, and the southern coasts of Sumatra and western Java, in Indonesia.

The fruit, termed a "syncardium", (a type of multiple fruit) weighs .

References 

leram
Plants described in 1867
Trees of Myanmar
Flora of Indonesia